Yombe may refer to:

 Yombe people, several groups in southern and central Africa
 Yombe or Kiyombe (ISO 639-3: yom), a dialect of the Kongo language of western Central Africa spoken by the Yombe people
 A dialect of the Tumbuka language spoken in Zambia by the Yombe people
 Léon Yombe (born 1944), Congolese sprinter

See also
 Kiyombe (disambiguation)
 Mayombe, a geographic area on the western coast of Africa
 Yomba, a volcano in Papua New Guinea